Dong Ping is a fictional character in Water Margin, one of the four great classical novels in Chinese literature. Nicknamed "General of Double Spears", he ranks 15th among the 36 Heavenly Spirits, the first third of the 108 Stars of Destiny.

Background
A native of Shangdang (上黨), located in present-day Yuncheng, Shanxi, Dong Ping serves as the garrison commandant in Dongping Prefecture (東平府; present-day Dongping County, Shandong). A fearsome warrior, he is nicknamed "General of Double Spears" as he fights with a pair of spears. He is handsome and an expert in music and the arts. Because he is gallant and has refined tastes, he is also called the "Debonair General of Double Spears".

Becoming an outlaw
Song Jiang leads a military attack on Dongping while Lu Junyi conducts another on Dongchang, under the agreement that whoever achieves conquest first would be elected the chief of Liangshan. Song sends Yu Baosi, an acquaintance of Dong Ping, and Wang Dingliu to coerce the prefect to surrender the city and give up its food stock. The prefect is cowed, but Dong Ping calms him down and suggests executing the two to strike fear in the bandits. Not ready to mortally anger Liangshan, the prefect orders Yu and Wang be beaten and thrown out.

Liangshan's Shi Jin volunteers to sneak into Dongping to launch an internal sabotage.  He takes cover in the house of a prostitute whom he has earlier patronised. But the brothel's owner squeals on him, leading to his arrest. The Liangshan outlaws immediately attack the city. Dong Ping battles with some of Liangshan's good fighters but neither side wins. Impressed with Dong's appearance and combat skill,  Song is determined to win him over. 

Meanwhile, Dong Ping, enamoured of the prefect's daughter, is unhappy with the prefect for repeatedly declining his proposal. 

One night, the outlaws taunt Dong Ping and lure him out of the city. Dong Ping falls into a hidden pit as he chases after Song Jiang and is captured. Song's sincere and warm treatment convinces him to surrender. Dong Ping then tricks the prefect to open the city gate, kills the man and seizes his daughter.

Death
Dong Ping is appointed as one of the Five Tiger Generals of the Liangshan cavalry after the 108 Stars of Destiny came together in what is called the Grand Assembly. He participates in the campaigns against the invading Liao army and rebel forces in Song territory following amnesty from Emperor Huizong for Liangshan.

In the battle of Dusong Pass (獨松關; located south of present-day Anji County, Zhejiang) in the campaign against Fang La, Dong Ping and Zhang Qing combat with Li Tianrun, one of Fang's generals. Although injured in the left arm by a projectile, Dong Ping continues to fight Li. But he finally finds the wound unbearable and retreats to his ranks for treatment, leaving Zhang Qing to take over the fight. Zhang is killed when his spear gets stuck in a tree. Seeing that, Dong Ping charges forth and kills Li. But Li Tianrun's comrade Zhang Tao sneaks up on him and slices him in two from behind.

References
 
 
 
 
 
 
 

36 Heavenly Spirits
Fictional characters from Shanxi